Selection and training in the British Army is the process by which candidates for service are identified, inducted and brought onto the trained strength.  The process is the responsibility of the Home Command.

Selection
Candidates for all three of the British Armed Forces are first handled through Armed Forces Career Offices, which are located in major conurbations around the United Kingdom supporting the respective recruitment functions.  Candidates for enlistment may be aged between 15 years, 7 months (for enlistment from age 16) and 32. Candidates for officer entry may be aged between 18 and 29.

Regular Army training
Candidates for the Army undergo common training, beginning with initial military training, to bring all personnel to a similar standard in basic military skills, and further specialist training is delivered according to the Regiment or Corps for which the individual has been identified as a candidate.  Completion of Initial Trade Training (ITT) brings the individual onto the trained strength; however, each of the British Armed Forces will continue to deliver specialist and generalist training throughout the individual's career.

Much training in the British Armed Forces has been accredited by various awarding bodies, resulting in the opportunity to gain civilian qualifications through service training activities.

Basic Training (BT)
Basic Training, which is often referred to as Phase 1 training, follows a standard syllabus for all new recruits. For other ranks, this is the Common Military Syllabus (Recruits) (CMSR). CMSR covers the skills and fitness needed to survive and operate in a field environment, and seeks to imbue the ethos and principles of the British Army.  The trainee is required to demonstrate competence in thirteen training objectives over the fourteen-week course. Officers undertake the Commissioning Course, which covers the basic aspects of soldiering as well as command, leadership and management. The standard course for new Direct Entry Officers lasts 44 weeks. Professionally qualified officers (those that have joined the army having already gained a professional qualification, such as doctors, lawyers or chaplains) undergo a shorter, ten-week course. The Late Entry Officers Course is a four-week course for already serving soldiers that have been chosen for commissioning as officers.

There are five training establishments for Basic Training in the Regular Army:

Basic Training is intended to bring all recruits to a base level of military competency, capable of operating in the field, providing force protection, operational security and displaying the other characteristics of a member of the British Army. For officers, this also includes the professional competencies required for command. During this period, recruits pass in and receive their regimental berets; they then pass out and continue to Initial Trade Training to undergo job training. The training embeds the core values:

 Courage
 Discipline
 Respect for others
 Integrity
 Loyalty
 Selfless commitment

Initial Trade Training (ITT)
The Initial Trade Training involves the new officer or soldier training for the branch of the service they wish to specialise in, and then undergoing specific training, now called Subsequent Trade Training (STT).  This is with one of the specialist schools located around the country:

 * Since 2001, infantry training for other ranks is undertaken as a single 26-week course (30 weeks for the Parachute Regiment and Foot Guards) at the Infantry Training Centre at Catterick Garrison, as opposed to being divided into BT and ITT training.

Army Reserve training

Soldiers 

For Army Reserve soldiers, recruit training is in two parts: Basic Training (BT), also known as the Common Military Syllabus (Reserve) (CMS(R)) Course, and Initial Trade Training (ITT), special-to-arm training.

Basic Training

In Basic Training, recruits cover the Common Military Syllabus 14 (CMS14). Part 'a' is a series of four training weekends at Army Training Units (ATUs), formerly known as Regional Training Centres (RTCs).  At some ATUs the Phase 1a is also run as a consolidated course.  For all Army Reserve soldiers, Phase 1 concludes with a fifteen-day training course (Phase 1b) normally held at an Army Training Regiment; infantry recruits then undertake their Initial Trade Training at Catterick.  Recruits to the 4th Battalion, The Parachute Regiment and the Honourable Artillery Company complete their equivalent of CMS(R) within their own units.  Recruits to the two regiments of the SAS Reserve are sponsored out to a local AR unit to complete basic training.

Initial Trade Training (ITT)

ITT is a further period of special-to-arm training specific to the type of unit the recruit is joining.  This is normally conducted by the Arm or Service that the recruit is joining, for example for infantry units, ITT consists of the two-week Combat Infantry Course (Reserve) (CIC (Res)) held at the Infantry Training Centre, Catterick.

Officers 

To gain a commission, potential officers have to pass through four modules of training, which together form the Army Reserve Commissioning Course.

Module A consists of basic field training and elementary military skills.  This can be completed at either a UOTC over a number of weekends, or over two weeks at the Royal Military Academy Sandhurst (RMAS).

Module B covers training in Tactics, Leadership, Doctrine and Navigation, both in theory and in practice, with a focus on the section battle drills and the platoon combat estimate.  This training can either be spread over ten weekends at a UOTC, or two weeks at the RMAS.

Module C builds on the Tactics, Leadership, Doctrine and Navigation taught in Module B, with a greater focus on the theory behind these constructs.  CBRN training is also added at this point, and Officer Cadets undergo a number of field exercises to test their military and leadership skills.  Module C can only be undertaken at the RMAS.

Module D: once the Officer Cadet has completed their Army Officer Selection Board, they can complete this final module, after which they will become commissioned officers in the British Army.  Based at the RMAS, this module consists primarily of a prolonged field exercise, followed by drill training in preparation for the passing out parade.

On successful completion of Module D, the Officer Cadets receive their Commission and become Second Lieutenants.  Further training that is required prior to them being considered for operational deployment and promotion to Lieutenant includes:

Post Commissioning Training (formerly known as Module 5), again run at an OTC, over three weekends.

Special To Arm training is specific to the type of unit the subaltern is joining, and covers a two-week period.  This is increasingly integrated with the tactics phase of a Regular training course.  Examples are the Platoon Commander's Battle Course held at the Infantry Battle School in Brecon, which is integrated with Regular training, or the Yeomanry Tactics Course held at the Land Warfare Centre in Warminster, which is not.

References

External links 
 Training in the Army at army.mod.uk

Military selection in the United Kingdom